Takuro Yamashita (山下拓郎; born May 22, 1988) is a Japanese professional ice hockey forward currently playing for the Tohoku Free Blades of the Asia League.

Since 2011 he plays for the Tohoku Free Blades. He previously played at amateur level for the Komazawa Tomakomai team and for the Waseda University. He also plays in the senior Japan national team since 2012 until now.

References

Free Blades's players profile

1988 births
People from Kushiro, Hokkaido
Japanese ice hockey forwards
Living people
Sportspeople from Hokkaido
Asian Games bronze medalists for Japan
Medalists at the 2017 Asian Winter Games
Asian Games medalists in ice hockey
Ice hockey players at the 2017 Asian Winter Games
Tohoku Free Blades players